Óscar Vargas Prieto (August 8, 1917–January 17, 1989) was a Peruvian soldier and politician. He is Prime Minister of Peru (August 1975 – January 1976).

References

Peruvian soldiers
Prime Ministers of Peru
1917 births
1989 deaths